Electric Loco Shed, Ludhiana is a motive power depot performing locomotive maintenance and repair facility for electric locomotives of the Indian Railways, located at  of the Northern Railway zone in Punjab, India.

Operation
Being one of the three electric engine sheds in Northern Railway, various major and minor maintenance schedules of electric locomotives are carried out here. It has the sanctioned capacity of 175 engine units. Beyond the operating capacity, this shed houses a total of 198 engine units, including 55 WAG-7 and 143 WAG-9. LDH were holds WAP-4 & WAG-5 locomotives now all transferred to other sheds. Like all locomotive sheds, LDH does regular maintenance, overhaul and repair including painting and washing of locomotives.

In 2020, the depot built a battery-operated shunter using components scavenged from decommissioned locomotives. The shunter can be powered either directly from overhead wires, or from battery power for limited time periods. It operates in place of a diesel shunter.

Locomotives

References

Ludhiana
Ludhiana district
Rail transport in Punjab, India
2001 establishments in Punjab, India